The Office of Health Economics (OHE) is a research and consultancy company and registered charity based in London.

History 
The OHE was founded in 1962, making it one of the oldest institutions in the field of health economics. It was established by the Association of the British Pharmaceutical Industry to:
 commission and undertake research on the economics of health and health care,
 collect and analyse health and health care data for the UK and other countries,
 disseminate the results of its work and stimulate discussion of them and their policy implications.

In 2016, the OHE became a charity.

Notable works 
The OHE conducts work for clients across different sectors, including the UK's Department of Health.

References 

Off
Consulting firms established in 1962
Health economics
Off
off
1962 establishments in England
1962 establishments in the United Kingdom